The following is a timeline of the history of the city of Baton Rouge, Louisiana, USA.

Prior to 19th century

 1721Fort established by French.
 1763Period of British West Florida begins.
 1779September: Battle of Baton Rouge at Fort New Richmond, during the Gulf Coast campaign of the American Revolutionary War.
 1783Period of Spanish West Florida officially begins; Baton Rouge fort has been renamed Fort San Carlos.

19th century
 1805 – Spanish Town, first residential area, is established.
 1806 – Beauregard Town, second neighborhood, is established.
 1810 – Baton Rouge becomes part of the Republic of West Florida in September, but by December the republic is annexed by the U.S. into the Territory of Orleans, which in 1812 becomes the state of Louisiana.
 1812-1815 – War of 1812, including the Creek War and the Battle of New Orleans
 1817 – Town incorporated.
 1819 – Baton-Rouge Gazette newspaper begins publication.
 1833 – State Library of Louisiana headquartered in Baton Rouge.
 1835 – Louisiana State Penitentiary in operation.
 1842 – Democratic Advocate newspaper begins publication.
 1849 – Baton Rouge becomes capital of Louisiana.
 1850 – First Capitol building constructed.
 1852 – Louisiana Institute for the Education of the Deaf and Dumb and Blind and Magnolia Cemetery established.
 1860 – Andrew Lytle photography studio in business.
 1861 – January 23: Louisiana secession convention held.
 1862
 May 12: City occupied by U.S. federal troops.
 August 5: Battle of Baton Rouge (1862).
 1867 – Baton Rouge National Cemetery established.
 1868 – St. Joseph's Academy founded.
 1869 – Seminary of Learning of the State of Louisiana relocated to Baton Rouge.
 1870 – Seminary renamed "Louisiana State University".
 1877 – Synagogue dedicated.
 1882 – State capital returns to Baton Rouge, following the Reconstruction Era.
 1897 – Audubon Sugar School of Louisiana State University founded.

20th century

 1905 – Daily State newspaper in publication.
 1909 – Baton Rouge Refinery commissioned.
 1914 – Southern University relocates to Scotlandville, along Scott's Bluff facing the Mississippi River in North Baton Rouge.
 1916 – Historical Society of East and West Baton Rouge established.
 1923 – Baton Rouge General Hospital active.
 1924 – Community Coffee in business.
 1926
 New Louisiana State University campus dedicated.
 Baton Rouge High School and Arcade Theatre built.
 Louisiana Municipal Association headquartered in Baton Rouge.
 1928
 City Park Golf Course opens.
 Louisiana State University's College of Commerce established.
 1929 – State Theater built.
 1932 – Louisiana State Capitol inaugurated.
 1934 - WJBO radio begins broadcasting.
 1935 – Huey P. Long assassinated.
 1939 – East Baton Rouge Parish Library established.
 1940
 Baton Rouge League of Women Voters founded.
 Population: 34,719.
 1944 – Piccadilly Restaurant in business.
 1947
 City and Parish of East Baton Rouge consolidated.
 Baton Rouge Civic Symphony Orchestra active.
 H. J. Wilson Co. in business.
 1950 – Population: 125,629.
 1953
 June 20–28: Baton Rouge bus boycott held during Civil Rights Movement.
 WAFB-TV (television) begins broadcasting.
 1955 – WBRZ-TV begins broadcasting.
 1960
 Baton Rouge sit-ins, marches, and demonstrations by Southern University students during the Civil Rights Movement.
 Broadmoor High School founded.
 Population: 152,419.
 1961 – Roman Catholic Diocese of Baton Rouge established.
 1962
 January 19: "Protestors force Southern University...to temporarily shut down."
 City Parish Beautification Commission established.
 1963 – Foundation for Historical Louisiana headquartered in Baton Rouge.
 1964 – Baton Rouge Chapter of the Links established.
 1970
 Baton Rouge Zoo established near city.
 Population: 165,963.
 1974 – One American Place (hi-rise) built.
 1976 – Cortana Mall Cinema in business.
 1978 – Comité des Archives de la Louisiane founded.
 1979 – Louisiana Association of Museums headquartered in city.
 1980 - Population: 219,419.
 1981 – LSU Hilltop Arboretum established.
 1982 – City and Parish of East Baton Rouge governments merged.
 1986 – Atchafalaya National Wildlife Refuge established near city.
 1987 - Richard Baker becomes U.S. representative for Louisiana's 6th congressional district.
 1990 – Population: 219,531.
 1997
 Mall of Louisiana in business.
 Datta Temple & Hall of Trinity consecrated.
 1998 – City website online.

21st century

 2001: Bobby Simpson becomes mayor-president of East Baton Rouge Parish.
 2005
 August 29: Hurricane Katrina.
 First African-American, Kip Holden, becomes mayor-president of East Baton Rouge Parish.
 Shaw Center for the Arts opens.
 2007: Cinemark 16 Perkins Rowe (cinema) in business.
 2010: Population: 229,493 city; 440,171 parish.
 2011: Cedric Richmond becomes U.S. representative for Louisiana's 2nd congressional district.
 2012
 April: Exxon Baton Rouge Refinery pipeline oil spill.
 June 14: Exxon Baton Rouge Refinery benzene leak.
 2016
July 5: Alton Sterling was fatally shot by a police officer, which led to protests in Baton Rouge.
July 9: Protest against police violence.
July 17: 2016 shooting of Baton Rouge police officers
August: 2016 Louisiana floods submerge thousands of homes throughout the parish

See also
 History of Baton Rouge, Louisiana
 List of mayors of Baton Rouge, Louisiana
 National Register of Historic Places listings in East Baton Rouge Parish, Louisiana
 Other cities in Louisiana:
 Timeline of New Orleans
 Timeline of Shreveport, Louisiana

References

Bibliography

Published in the 19th century
 
 

Published in the 20th century
 
  + Chronology
 
 
 Meyers, Rose.   A History of Baton Rouge, 1699–1812 (1976)
 
  (fulltext via Open Library)

Published in the 21st century
 
  (fulltext via Open Library)

External links

 
 
 
 Items related to Baton Rouge, various dates (via Digital Public Library of America).
 

Years in Louisiana
Baton Rouge
 
Baton Rouge